Bioresorbable (also called biodegradable or bioabsorbable) metals are metals or their alloys that degrade safely within the body. The primary metals in this category are magnesium-based and iron-based alloys, although recently zinc has also been investigated. Currently, the primary uses of bioresorbable metals are as stents for blood vessels (for example bioresorbable stents) and other internal ducts.

Background
Although bioabsorbable polymers and other materials have come into widespread use in recent years, degradable metals have not yet had the same success in the medical industry.

Driving force for development
The driving force behind the development of bioresorbable metals is primarily due to their ability to provide metal-like mechanical properties while degrading safely in the body. This is especially relevant in orthopaedic applications, where although many surgeries only require implants to provide temporary support (allowing the surrounding tissue to heal), the majority of current bio-metals are permanent (e.g. stainless steel, titanium). Degradation of the implant means that intervention or secondary surgery will not be necessary to remove the material at the end of its functional life, providing significant savings in both cost and time for the patient and health care system. In addition, the corrosion products of current bio-metals (which will still corrode in the body to some degree) can generally not be considered biocompatible.

Potential applications
There are a number of applications for biodegradable metals, including cardiovascular implants (i.e. stents) and orthopedics. It is in this latter category where these materials offer the greatest potential. Bioresorbable metals are able to withstand loads that would destroy any currently available polymers, and offer much greater plasticity than bioceramics, which are brittle and prone to fracture. A well-designed implant could provide the exact mechanical support needed for different areas (through alloying and metal working), and load would be transferred to the surrounding tissue over time, letting it heal and reducing the effects of stress shielding. A summary of the primary benefits and drawbacks of magnesium biomaterials has been provided by Kirkland.

Considerations and issues facing bioresorbable metal development

Changing shape over time
It is the same advantage that bioresorbable metals possess over non-degradable current materials, their biodegradability, that poses the greatest challenges to their development and wider use. The degradable nature of any implant means that their shape and thus mechanical properties will change through its lifetime. This means that lifecycle analysis must be performed on any implant, especially one designed for orthopedic applications where failure could result in death.

Lack of standards
Current standards for corrosion of metals have been found to not apply well to bioresorbable metals during in vitro testing. This is a significant problem as the majority of tests performed in the research community are a mix of other standards from both the biomedical and the engineering (e.g. corrosion) communities, often making comparison between results difficult.

Corrosion Product Toxicity
Even though all elements in a bioresorbable metal may themselves be considered biocompatible, the morphology and elemental makeup (or combination of elements) of the degradation products may cause adverse reactions in the body. In addition, the rapid evolution of hydrogen gas that is concomitant with Mg-alloy degradation may cause addition problems in vivo. It is therefore crucial to intricately understand the corrosion of each implant and the products that are release, in light of their toxicity and the likelihood of inflammation. The majority of studies in the literature have focused on elements that are known to be biocompatible or abundant in the body, such as calcium and zinc.

Potential bioresorbable metal candidates
Although all metals will degrade and eventually disappear inside the body through the processes of corrosion and wear, true bioresorbable metals must have an appreciable degradation rate to allow the implant to be absorbed in a practical amount of time in reference to their application. Also, any degradation product would have to be safely metabolized or excreted by the body to avoid toxicity and inflammation.

Magnesium
Perhaps the most widely investigated material in this category, magnesium was originally investigated as a potential biomaterial in 1878 when it was used by physician Edward C. Huse in wire form as a ligature to stop bleeding. Development continued into the 1920s, after which Mg-based biomaterials fell out of general investigation due to their poor performance (likely due to impurities in the alloys drastically increasing corrosion). It was not until the late 1990s that interest started to pick up again, spurred by the availability of ultra-high purity Mg, which significantly increases its longevity inside the body.

Currently, most research on Mg is focused on reducing and controlling the rate of degradation, with many alloys corroding too rapidly (in vitro) for any practical application.

Iron
The majority of iron-based alloy research has been focused on cardiovascular applications, such as stents. However this area receives much less interest in the research community than Mg-based alloys.

Zinc
To date little work has been published on the use of a primarily zinc-based biomaterial, with corrosion rates found to be very low and zinc within a tolerable toxicity range

Biodegradable bulk metallic glasses
Although strictly speaking a side-category, a related, relatively new area of interest has been the investigation of bioabsorbable metallic glass, with a group at UNSW currently investigating these novel materials.

References

Biomaterials